Georgia State Route 14 Spur may refer to:

 Georgia State Route 14 Spur (LaGrange): a spur route of State Route 14 that exists in LaGrange
 Georgia State Route 14 Spur (Red Oak): a former spur route of State Route 14 that existed in Red Oak

014 Spur